Eric Anson (22 November 1892 – 5 June 1969) was New Zealand's first specialist anaesthetist. He was the first President of the New Zealand Society of Anaesthetists (NZSA) and a member of the NZ Committee of the Faculty of Anaesthetists.

Early life and education
Anson was born in Wellington and educated at Wangurai Collegiate School. He went to Trinity College, Cambridge, and then to St Thomas's Hospital St Thomas's Hospital Medical School now part of King's College London, from which he graduated in January 1916.

Career
He served in the Royal Navy in World War I, and in May 1917 was wounded in action. After the war, he worked as an anaesthetist in Birmingham before returning to New Zealand in 1922 to practise anaesthetics as a specialty – the first New Zealander qualified to do so.

Between the wars Anson practised in Wellington and was a key figure in the New Zealand Branch of the British Medical Association. During World War II he served in the New Zealand Army Medical Corps, both in Egypt and on the hospital ship Oranje. From late 1945 to 1957 he was Director of Anaesthetics to the Auckland hospitals, where he was a pioneer in cardiothoracic anaesthesia. He was especially well regarded by Sir George Douglas Robb for his ability to have his patients wake up promptly enough to say "Thank you, Mr. Robb" before leaving theatre.

References

1892 births
1969 deaths
Alumni of St Thomas's Hospital Medical School
Alumni of Trinity College, Cambridge
New Zealand anaesthetists
People from Wellington City
Royal Navy personnel of World War I
20th-century New Zealand medical doctors
New Zealand military personnel of World War II